Duzkand (also Romanized as Dūzkand) is a village in Qaleh Juq Rural District of Anguran District of Mahneshan County, Zanjan province, Iran. At the 2006 National Census, its population was 725 in 162 households. The following census in 2011 counted 680 people in 213 households. The latest census in 2016 showed a population of 556 people in 187 households; it was the largest village in its rural district.

References 

Mahneshan County

Populated places in Zanjan Province

Populated places in Mahneshan County